Schwabmünchen station is a railway station in the municipality of Schwabmünchen, in Bavaria, Germany. It is located the Augsburg–Buchloe of Deutsche Bahn.

Services
 the following services stop at Schwabmünchen:

References

External links
 
 Schwabmünchen layout 
 

Railway stations in Bavaria
Buildings and structures in Augsburg (district)